Danestone is a small, village-like area of Aberdeen, Scotland, located next to the suburb of Bridge of Don.

Located North of Aberdeen City Centre, Danestone is a relatively new area of Aberdeen. The area was all farmland until the 1980s when Danestone Primary School and many detached, semi-detached houses and bungalows were built.

The name Danestone came from the name of Danestone Farm.

Shopping and attractions
Danestone is served by a Tesco Extra store which is located just off of the Persley Bridge. The store includes other businesses such as Subway, Barnardo’s, Holland and Barrett, Timpson, a tanning salon, a money exchange bureau, a photography store and a hairdressers. There is also a Tesco Cafe upstairs.

There are a few attractions in Danestone like Danestone Play Park, a Bannatyne‘s health club and a forest along the River Don.

Danestone Primary School
Danestone Primary School started construction in 1984 and opened in 1986. The school was extended in 1988 to be able to accommodate up to 420 pupils. Mrs Corser was the first headteacher, who left in 2005 as the longest serving head teacher in Danestone Primary School’s history. The first-ever pupils welcomed to Danestone Primary School were Michael Douglas, Steven Winton, Kevin Henderson and Kevin Simpson. More pupils followed as housing construction, stretching the length of Danestone, was completed. Andrew Henderson won the first ever Pupil of The Year award in 1995. Later awards were given to pupils Hauen Yang, Steven Warman and David Blaine. The current headteacher is Mrs Page. It is an Eco-School.

Police Scotland

Formerly located in the Danestone Community Area on Fairview Street. The police station is no longer in use, making Danestone’s closest police station in Tillydrone.

Danestone Medical Practice

Danestone Medical Practice is a small Doctor’s surgery located in the Danestone Community Area on Fairview Street.

Danestone Community Centre
Located in the Danestone Community Area on Fairview Street.

Step by Step Pre-School Nursery

Step by Step Pre-School Nursery is a privately owned nursery for ages 0-5 years, located in the Danestone Community Area on Fairview Street.

Danestone Congregational Church

Danestone Congregational Church is located in the Danestone Community Area on Fairview Street. Danestone Congregational Church works with the local community as well as other Congregational Churches in Aberdeen.  Danestone Congregational Church take a leading role in the Danestone Gala, held each year in the Danestone Community Area. Danestone Congregational Church also has many groups including Youth Group, Good Afternoon Club and the Men's and Ladies' Groups, all of which the public are welcome to attend.

The Church of Jesus Christ of Latter-day Saints

There is meeting house of the Church of Jesus Christ of Latter-day Saints on Fairview Street, the main street through Danestone. Religious meetings open to everyone are held every Sunday and young men and young women engage in various activities on Tuesday evening. Members of the church take a leading role in serving the community and organise an annual Christmas 'Santa Float' that patrols the streets collecting money for local charities.

References

Areas of Aberdeen